Harisena may refer to:
 Harisena, a fourth century Sanskrit poet, panegyrist, and government minister
 Harisena (Jain monk), a tenth century Digambara Jain monk
 Harishena,, ruler of the Vakataka dynasty in India

See also 
 Harisen, a Japanese paper fan